Davide Bassi (born August 3, 1973), better known by his stage name Bassi Maestro (also known simply as Bassi), is an Italian rapper, deejay, beatmaker and producer from Milan, Italy. Bassi is one of the pioneers of Italian underground hip hop, having started his career back in 1988.

Career 
Following sit-in jam sessions and gatherings, Bassi released his debut singles and 
became known in the Italian hip hop scene as a DJ in the late eighties and early nineties. His first releases came in 1988 with two tracks in  English, called Explicitin the Facts and Art From the Heart. In 1992, Bassi Maestro released his first demo, of eight tracks, called Furia solista. In 1995 he founded the label "Mixmen Production" together with El Presidente, and he collaborated the following year with DJ Zeta.

Bassi worked on projects and live shows alongside DJ Gruff and Kaos One, including the first edition of Hip Hop Village in Torino in 1995. He released Contro gli estimatori, his first full-length album, which included collaborations with Tormento of Sottotono, El Presidente and La Pina on his own Mixman label.

He also produced beats for several american artists such as Coolio, Rakim, Busta Rhymes, Talib Kweli, M.O.P., Joell Ortiz, Jim Jones, Lloyd Banks and others.

Discography
Albums
 Contro gli estimatori (1996)
 Foto di gruppo (1998)
 Classico (2000)
 Rapper italiano (2001)
 Background (2002)
 Classe '73 (2003)
 L'ultimo testimone (2004)
 Seven: The Street Prequel (2004)
 Hate (2005)
 V.E.L.M. (Vivi e lascia morire) (2006)
 La lettera B (with Babaman) (2009)
 Tutti a casa (2011)
 Stanno tutti bene (2012)
 Guarda in cielo (2013)
 Mia maestà (2017)

EPs
 The Micragnous EP (as Sano Business) (1997)
 Sushi EP (2007)
 Vivo e vero EP (2010)
 Musica che non si tocca (with DJ Shocca) (2010)
 Per la mia gente - For My People (with Ghemon and Marco Polo) (2012)
 Vieni a prenderci (with Mondo Marcio) (2013)

Guest appearances

References

External links
 

1973 births
Living people
Singers from Milan
Italian hip hop musicians
21st-century Italian singers